Francine Verlot (born 2 May 1945) is a former Belgian racing cyclist. She finished in third place in the Belgian National Road Race Championships seven times between 1965 and 1974.

References

External links

1945 births
Living people
Belgian female cyclists
Cyclists from Hainaut (province)
People from Colfontaine